Launceston Leisure and Aquatic Centre is a double storey structure built at the old Windmill Hill Swimming Pool site in Launceston, Tasmania. The centre was opened on 25 May 2009, at a cost of A$26.3 million. The Launceston City Council estimates that 400,000 people would visit each year after the establishment period.

The Aquatic Centre includes an indoor aquatic pool area, which contains a 50-metre competition pool, spectator seating, leisure and learn to swim pools, children's play and splash park, hot water program pool, and a spa. An outdoor 25-metre pool contains a diving tank, beach entry and Water Slide. The outdoor pools are open from the first weekend in November to the last weekend in March. Upstairs is where LAfit is located. Lafit is a health and fitness club that offers a range of things from over 56 group fitness class, an extensive range of cardio equipment, pin loaded machines and free weights, outdoor fitness area and ongoing member support and programs.

Other facilities included are indoor program and meeting Spaces, a cafe called Cube Aqua with wet lounge areas, swim shop, outdoor terraces and social areas, associated plant rooms and storage areas and on-site and on street car parking with outdoor landscaped areas.
The new building area will span approximately 6,000 m2 and around 450 m2 of the existing Windmill Hill Swimming Pool will be renovated.

Gallery

References

External links
Official website

Swimming venues in Australia
Sports venues in Tasmania
Buildings and structures in Launceston, Tasmania
Sport in Launceston, Tasmania